Medina High School is a public high school in Medina, New York, United States. It is a part of the Medina Central School District.

Sports 
Medina's athletic teams are nicknamed the Mustangs and the school's colors are red, blue and white. Medina teams compete in the following sports:

Baseball
Boys & girls basketball
Boys & girls cross country
Football
Boys & girls golf
Boys & girls lacrosse
Boys & girls soccer
Boys & girls swimming
Boys & girls track & field
Volleyball
Wrestling
Softball
Field hockey

Demographics
79% of the student population at Medina High School identify as caucasian, 9% identify as multiracial, 7% identify as Hispanic, 4% identify as African American, 0.5% identity as American Indian/Alaskin Native, 0.2% identify as Asian, and 0.2% identify as Hawaiian Native/Pacific Islander. The student body makeup is 49% male and 51% female.

References

External links
 

Public high schools in New York (state)
Schools in Orleans County, New York